The Trousdale-Baskerville House, also known as Baskerville House and Maywood, is a historic house in Gallatin, Tennessee, U.S..

History
The house was built in 1838 for Richard H. May, the owner of plantations near Natchez, Mississippi who sold it to Benjamin Franklin Simpson in 1839. It was owned by Colonel George Elliott, a veteran of the War of 1812 and the First Seminole War who owned Wall Spring, from 1842 to 1846, when it was purchased by Dr. John Washington Franklin. During the American Civil War of 1861–1865, Franklin joined the Confederate States Army as a surgeon.

From 1869 to 1900, the house belonged to Charles Trousdale, a Confederate veteran who was the son of Tennessee Governor William Trousdale. It belonged to Rebecca Donelson Dismukes from 1901 to 1911, when it was purchased by J.T. Baskerville.

Architectural significance
The house was designed in the Federal architectural style. It was later redesigned in the Late Victorian and Colonial Revival architectural styles. It has been listed on the National Register of Historic Places since July 30, 2009.

References

Houses on the National Register of Historic Places in Tennessee
Federal architecture in Tennessee
Victorian architecture in Tennessee
Houses completed in 1838
Buildings and structures in Sumner County, Tennessee